Sir Hugh Anthony Rawlins is the former Chief Justice of the Eastern Caribbean Supreme Court; he succeeded Brian George Keith Alleyne in the position in 2008 and served until 2012. He had previously served as High Court Judge on the Court, residing in and hearing cases from Saint Kitts and Nevis in that capacity since 2005.

As Chief Justice of the Court, Rawlins was the supreme judicial officer of the courts of Anguilla, Antigua and Barbuda, the British Virgin Islands, Dominica, Grenada, Montserrat, Saint Kitts and Nevis, Saint Lucia, and Saint Vincent and the Grenadines.

Early life 

Rawlins is native of Saint Kitts and Nevis, having been born on Nevis. From 1989 to 1995, he was the Solicitor-General of Saint Kitts and Nevis. Prior to his appointment to the Eastern Caribbean Supreme Court, Rawlins had been a magistrate in Saint Kitts and Nevis.

Footnotes

Saint Kitts and Nevis judges
20th-century Saint Kitts and Nevis lawyers
Chief justices of the Eastern Caribbean Supreme Court
Year of birth missing (living people)
Living people
Saint Kitts and Nevis judges on the courts of Anguilla
Saint Kitts and Nevis judges on the courts of Antigua and Barbuda
Saint Kitts and Nevis judges on the courts of the British Virgin Islands
Saint Kitts and Nevis judges on the courts of Dominica
Saint Kitts and Nevis judges on the courts of Grenada
Saint Kitts and Nevis judges on the courts of Montserrat
Saint Kitts and Nevis judges on the courts of Saint Lucia
Saint Kitts and Nevis judges on the courts of Saint Vincent and the Grenadines
People from Nevis
Judges of the Administrative Tribunal of the International Labour Organization
Saint Kitts and Nevis judges of international courts and tribunals
21st-century Saint Kitts and Nevis lawyers